David Horne may refer to:

 David Horne (composer) (born 1970), Scottish composer, pianist, and teacher
 David Horne (actor) (1898–1970), British actor